Darbuka may refer to:

Darbuka or goblet drum, also chalice drum, tarabuka, tarabaki, derbake, debuka, doumbek, dumbec, dumbeg, dumbelek, tablah, toumperleki or zerbaghali, a percussion instrument
Darbuka Siva, an Indian musician, music producer and an actor based in Chennai, India.